West or Occident is one of the four cardinal directions or points of the compass. It is the opposite direction from east and is the direction in which the Sun sets on the Earth.

Etymology
The word "west" is a Germanic word passed into some Romance languages (ouest in French, oest in Catalan, ovest in Italian, oeste in Spanish and Portuguese). As in other languages, the word formation stems from the fact that west is the direction of the setting sun in the evening: 'west' derives from the Indo-European root *wes reduced from *wes-pero 'evening, night', cognate with Ancient Greek ἕσπερος hesperos 'evening; evening star; western' and Latin vesper 'evening; west'. Examples of the same formation in other languages include Latin occidens 'west' from occidō 'to go down, to set' and Hebrew מַעֲרָב maarav 'west' from עֶרֶב erev 'evening'.

Navigation
To go west using a compass for navigation (in a place where magnetic north is the same direction as true north) one needs to set a bearing or azimuth of 270°.

West is the direction opposite that of the Earth's rotation on its axis, and is therefore the general direction towards which the Sun appears to constantly progress and eventually set. This is not true on the planet Venus, which rotates in the opposite direction from the Earth (retrograde rotation). To an observer on the surface of Venus, the Sun would rise in the west and set in the east although Venus's opaque clouds prevent observing the Sun from the planet's surface.

In a map with north at the top, west is on the left.

Moving continuously west is following a circle of latitude.

Weather
Due to the direction of the Earth's rotation, the prevailing wind in many places in the middle latitudes (i.e. between 35 and 65 degrees latitude) is from the west, known as the westerlies.

Cultural

The phrase "the West" is often spoken in reference to the Western world, which includes the European Union (also the EFTA countries), the United Kingdom, the Americas, Israel, Australia, New Zealand and (in part) South Africa.

The concept of the Western part of the earth has its roots in the Western Roman Empire and the Western Christianity. During the Cold War "the West" was often used to refer to the NATO camp as opposed to the Warsaw Pact and non-aligned nations. The expression survives, with an increasingly ambiguous meaning.

Symbolic meanings
In Chinese Buddhism, the West represents movement toward the Buddha or enlightenment (see Journey to the West). The ancient Aztecs believed that the West was the realm of the great goddess of water, mist, and maize. In Ancient Egypt, the West was considered to be the portal to the netherworld, and is the cardinal direction regarded in connection with death, though not always with a negative connotation. Ancient Egyptians also believed that the Goddess Amunet was a personification of the West. The Celts believed that beyond the western sea off the edges of all maps lay the Otherworld, or Afterlife.

In Judaism, west is seen to be toward the Shekinah (presence) of God, as in Jewish history the Tabernacle and subsequent Jerusalem Temple faced east, with God's Presence in the Holy of Holies up the steps to the west.  According to the Bible, the Israelites crossed the Jordan River westward into the Promised Land. In Islam, while in India, people pray facing towards the west as in respect to Mecca, Mecca is in the West-ward direction.

In American literature (e.g., in The Great Gatsby) moving West has sometimes symbolized gaining freedom, perhaps as an association with the settling of the Wild West (see also the American frontier and Manifest Destiny).

Fantasy fiction
Tolkien used it symbolically, with the dying Thorin calling Bilbo Baggins "child of the kindly West" in The Hobbit.  This is much more definite in The Lord of the Rings, where the east served Sauron and his enemies associate themselves with the West.

In Saberhagen's Empire of the East series, the rival powers are West and East, including both humans and supernatural beings.  All demons are part of the East.

This is not universal.  In Tolkien's earlier work, the north had been the direction of evil.  C S Lewis in The Voyage of the Dawn Treader has the east as the sacred direction, leading to Aslan's country

References

External links
 

Orientation (geometry)